Henri "Trollhorn" Sorvali, born 19 October 1978 in Finland, is the guitarist and keyboardist of the pagan metal band Moonsorrow, and keyboardist for Finntroll.

He also played keyboards on a few occasional gigs with The Rasmus in the late 1990s. Besides he was the leader of the folk/ambient project Lunar Womb, which in the end in 1999 was a solo project. He has also played in bands called Thunderdogs and Lakupaavi (a side project done as a joke by members of Moonsorrow), and played as a session musician on Ensiferum's self-titled debut album and Glittertind's mini-album Til Dovre Faller. He currently works as a music producer for Rovio Entertainment.

Sorvali gets inspiration from bands like Anthrax, Bal-Sagoth, Bathory, Cannibal Corpse, Darkthrone, Helheim, Maze of Torment, Merciless and Thyrfing. His idols are Frank Zappa, Danny Elfman, and Jeremy Soule.

He is the cousin of Ville Sorvali, frontman of Moonsorrow. He has also worked as a music teacher in the Sibelius-lukio (Sibelius High School) in Helsinki. He no longer plays live with Moonsorrow though he remains active with the band through recording in the studio and composing most of their music. Instead, guitarist Janne Perttilä plays live in his place.

References

1978 births
Finntroll members
Living people
Finnish heavy metal guitarists
Finnish keyboardists
Musicians from Helsinki
Finnish multi-instrumentalists
21st-century guitarists